Marie Eline (February 27, 1902 – January 3, 1981) was an American silent film child actress and sister of Grace Eline. Their mother was an actress.

Eline acted on stage for three years before she acted in films. Nicknamed "The Thanhouser Kid", she began acting for the Thanhouser Company in New Rochelle, New York, at the age of eight and starred in exactly one hundred films between 1910 and 1914.

By August 1915, Eline headed her own vaudeville company, presenting a playlet. In 1929, the Eline sisters formed a specialty act that was featured in an "'all-girl' show" that performed in Atlanta, Georgia. The duo was still performing in 1932.

Filmography
 A Doll's House (1911; short film)
 David Copperfield (1911)
 Uncle Tom's Cabin (1914) .... Little Eva St. Clair
 The Purse and the Girl (1914)
 Cupid's Lieutenant (1913)
 The Law of Humanity (1913)
 His Imaginary Family (1913)
 A Campaign Manageress (1913)
 Looking for Trouble (1913)
 Lobster Salad and Milk (1913)
 Flood Tide (1913/I)
 The Medium's Nemesis (1913)
 Just a Shabby Doll (1913) .... The little girl of long ago
 The Dove in the Eagle's Nest (1913) .... The Eagle's Sister
 The Tiniest of Stars (1913) .... The Little Boy
 The Evidence of the Film (1913) .... Messenger Boy
 The Forest Rose (1912)
 The Truant's Doom (1912) .... Tim, the Little Truant Boy
 Cross Your Heart (1912) .... The Farmer's Little Daughter
 In Time of Peril (1912) .... The Younger Brother
 Put Yourself in His Place (1912)
 In a Garden (1912) .... Miss May as a Child
 When Mercy Tempers Justice (1912) .... One of the Daughters
 The Warning (1912) .... The Young Son
 Please Help the Pore (1912) .... The Poor Couple's Daughter
 But the Greatest of These Is Charity (1912) .... The Poor Mother's Child
 Don't Pinch My Pup (1912) .... Tim, The Little Newsboy
 Treasure Trove (1912) .... The Gold-Seeking Country Boy
 The Ranchman and the Hungry Bird (1912) .... The Little Boy
 Nursie and the Knight (1912) .... The Little Girl
 Doggie's Debut (1912) .... Jack, the Little Boy
 The Professor's Son (1912) .... The Professor's Son
 On the Stroke of Five (1912)
 Her Secret (1912)
 Dottie's New Doll (1912) .... Dottie
 The Little Shut-In (1912) .... The Little Shut-In
 The Cry of the Children (1912) .... Alice, the little girl
 When Mandy Came to Town (1912) .... Mandy
 The Baby Bride (1912) .... The Little Boy
 The Star of the Side Show (1912) .... A Midget, The Star of the Side Show
 Nicholas Nickleby (1912) .... Squeers' Son, Wackford
 The Poacher (1912) .... The Old Man's Grandson
 The Guilty Baby (1912) .... The Plumber's Detective Daughter
 Washington in Danger (1912) .... The Little Black Boy
 On Probation (1912) .... The Orphan Granddaughter
 East Lynne (1912) .... Willie
 Her Ladyship's Page (1912) .... Her Ladyship's Page
 Dr. Jekyll and Mr. Hyde (1912) .... Little girl knocked down by Hyde
 Just a Bad Kid (1912) .... The Bad Kid
 The Passing (1912)
 She (1911) .... Leo Vincey as a Youth
 The Tomboy (1911) (as The Thanhouser Kid) .... The Tomboy's Little Sister
 The Newsy and the Tramp (1911) .... Ragsy, the Newsboy
 The Missing Heir (1911) .... The Little Heir
 The Satyr and the Lady (1911) .... The Peddler's Daughter
 David Copperfield (1911) .... Em'ly as a Child
 The Tempter and Dan Cupid (1911) .... Dan Cupid
 The Five Rose Sisters (1911) .... The Littlest Rose Sister
 In the Chorus (1911) .... The Little Daughter
 The Buddhist Priestess (1911) .... The Little Daughter
 Cupid the Conqueror (1911) .... Cupid
 Back to Nature (1911) .... The Sick Child
 The Judge's Story (1911) .... The Little Black Boy
 The Pied Piper of Hamelin (1911) .... The Little Lame Boy
 Two Little Girls (1911) .... Forlorn, unknown stepsister
 The Court's Decree (1911) .... The Little Daughter
 Lorna Doone (1911) .... Lorna, Age 5
 Flames and Fortune (1911) .... The Youngster
 The Stepmother (1911) .... The Younger Sister
 A Circus Stowaway (1911) .... The Little Boy Circus Stowaway
 Get Rich Quick (1911) .... Daughter of poor widow
 The Stage Child (1911) .... The Stage Chlld
 The Colonel and the King (1911) .... George IV, The Child King
 The Poet of the People (1911)
 Velvet and Rags (1911) .... A Little Boy
 The Charity of the Poor (1911) .... The Little Girl
 Silas Marner (1911) .... The Little Orphan Girl
 Stage Struck (1911)
 The Little Mother (1911) .... The Little Mother
 A Newsboy Hero (1911) .... Marie, the Little Daughter
 Adrift (1911) .... Their Young Daughter
 Only in the Way (1911) .... Marie
 The Old Curiosity Shop (1911) .... Little Nell
 The Vicar of Wakefield (1910)
 Rip Van Winkle (1910/II)
 A Thanksgiving Surprise (1910)
 The Little Fire Chief (1910) .... Willie Stone
 Ten Nights in a Bar Room (1910) .... Little Mary
 The Fairies' Hallowe'en (1910) .... Marie
 The Restoration (1910) .... The Little Girl
 The Mermaid (1910)
 Uncle Tom's Cabin (1910/II) .... Little Eva
 The Playwright's Love (1910) .... Grace, an Orphan
 The Girls of the Ghetto (1910) .... An Immigrant Child of the Ghetto
 The Lucky Shot (1910) .... The Little Boy
 The Flag of His Country (1910) .... The Granddaughter
 The Governor's Daughter (1910) .... Nell, the Governor's Daughter
 The Little Hero of Holland (1910) .... Hans, the Little Dutch Boy
 The Two Roses (1910) .... Tony's Son
 The Best Man Wins (1910) .... A Poor Charwoman's Tiny Daughter
 Jane Eyre (1910) .... Jane Eyre as a Child
 A Twenty-Nine Cent Robbery (1910) .... Edna Robinson

References

External links

Marie Eline biography at Thanhouser Company

American child actresses
Actresses from Milwaukee
American film actresses
American silent film actresses
1902 births
1981 deaths
20th-century American actresses
List of American former child actors